The genus Carex, the sedges, is one of the largest genera of flowering plants, containing around 1800 species, according to a 2004 estimate. All the species (including hybrid species) accepted by The Plant List  are given below:  In May 2015, the Global Carex Group argued for a broader circumscription of Carex,  proposing the addition of all species currently classified in Cymophyllus (1 species), Kobresia (c. 60 species), Schoenoxiphium (c. 15 species) and Uncinia (c. 70 species) to those already classified as Carex. (Not all of these have been  added below.)

Species

A

Carex × abitibiana Lepage
Carex aboriginum M.E.Jones
Carex × abortiva Holmb.
Carex abrupta Mack.
Carex abscondita Mack.
Carex acaulis d'Urv.
Carex accrescens Ohwi – Seoul sedge
Carex acicularis Boott
Carex acidicola Naczi
Carex acocksii C.Archer
Carex acuta L.
Carex × acutangula (F.Nyl.) Väre
Carex acutata Boott
Carex acutiformis Ehrh.
Carex adelostoma V.I.Krecz.
Carex adrienii E.G.Camus
Carex adusta Boott
Carex aematorrhyncha Desv.
Carex aequialta Kük.
Carex × aestivaliformis Mack.
Carex aestivalis M.A.Curtis ex A.Gray
Carex aethiopica Schkuhr
Carex agglomerata C.B.Clarke
Carex aggregata Mack.
Carex × akitaensis Fujiw.
Carex × akiyamana Ohwi
Carex alajica Litv.
Carex alata Torr.
Carex alba Scop.
Carex albata Boott ex Franch. – ditch sedge
Carex × albertii H.Lév.
Carex albicans Willd. ex Spreng.
Carex albida L.H.Bailey
Carex albidibasis T.Koyama
Carex albolutescens Schwein.
Carex albonigra Mack.
Carex alboviridis C.B.Clarke
Carex albula Allan
Carex albursina E.Sheld.
Carex algida Turcz. ex V.I.Krecz.
Carex allanii Hamlin
Carex alligata Boott
Carex alliiformis C.B.Clarke
Carex allivescens V.I.Krecz.
Carex × allolepis Rchb.
Carex × alluvialis Figert
Carex alma L.H.Bailey
Carex × almii Holmb.
Carex alopecoidea Tuck.
Carex alopecuroides D.Don ex Tilloch & Taylor
Carex × alsatica Zahn
Carex alsophila F.Muell.
Carex altaica Gorodkov
Carex amgunensis F.Schmidt
Carex amicta Boott
Carex amphibola Steud.
Carex amplectens Mack.
Carex amplifolia Boott
Carex andersonii Boott
Carex andicola G.A.Wheeler
Carex andina Phil.
Carex andringitrensis Cherm.
Carex angolensis Nelmes
Carex angustata Boott
Carex angustifructus (Kük.) Nelmes
Carex angustinowiczii Meinsh. ex Korsh.
Carex angustispica Reznicek & S.González
Carex angustisquama Franch.
Carex angustiutricula F.T.Wang & Tang ex L.K.Dai
Carex × aniaiensis Fujiw. & Y.Matsuda
Carex anisoneura V.I.Krecz.
Carex anisostachys Liebm.
Carex annectens (E.P.Bicknell) E.P.Bicknell
Carex anningensis F.T.Wang & Tang ex P.C.Li
Carex anomoea Hand.-Mazz.
Carex anthoxanthea J.Presl & C.Presl
Carex × anticostensis (Fernald) Lepage
Carex antoniensis A.Chev.
Carex aperta Boott
Carex aphanolepis Franch. & Sav. – nerved-scale sedge
Carex aphylla Kunth
Carex aphyllopus Kük.
Carex apiahyensis Palla
Carex apoiensis Akiyama
Carex appalachica J.M.Webber & P.W.Ball
Carex appendiculata (Trautv. & C.A.Mey.) Kük. – appendicular sedge
Carex applanata Thorsen et de Lange
Carex appressa R.Br.
Carex appropinquata Schumach.
Carex aquatilis Wahlenb.
Carex aquilonalis Akiyama
Carex × arakanei T.Koyama
Carex arapahoensis Clokey
Carex archeri Boott
Carex arcta Boott
Carex arctata Boott
Carex arctiformis Mack.
Carex × arctophila F.Nyl.
Carex arenaria L.
Carex arenicola F.Schmidt – wet-sand sedge
Carex argentina Barros
Carex argunensis Turcz. ex Ledeb.
Carex argyi H.Lév. & Vaniot
Carex argyrantha Tuck. ex Boott
Carex aridula V.I.Krecz.
Carex arisanensis Hayata
Carex aristatisquamata Tang & F.T.Wang ex L.K.Dai
Carex aristulifera P.C.Li
Carex arkansana (L.H.Bailey) L.H.Bailey
Carex arnellii Christ ex Scheutz – Musan sedge
Carex arnottiana Nees ex Drejer
Carex arsenei Kük.
Carex × arthuriana C.L.Beckm. & Figert
Carex × aschersonii H.Lév.
Carex ascotreta C.B. Clarke – long Mokpo sedge
Carex asperifructus Kük.
Carex asraoi D.M.Verma
Carex assiniboinensis W.Boott
Carex asturica Boiss.
Carex asynchrona Naczi
Carex atherodes Spreng.
Carex athrostachya Olney
Carex atlantica L.H.Bailey
Carex atlasica (H.Lindb.) Tattou
Carex atractodes F.J.Herm.
Carex atrata L. – black-spike sedge
Carex atratiformis Britton
Carex atrivaginata Nelmes
Carex atrofusca Schkuhr
Carex atrofuscoides K.T.Fu
Carex atropicta Steud.
Carex atrosquama Mack.
Carex atroviridis Ohwi
Carex aueri Kalela
Carex augustini Tuyama
Carex augustinowiczii Meinsh. – Augustinowicz's sedge
Carex aurea Nutt.
Carex aureolensis Steud.
Carex × auroniensis L.C.Lamb.
Carex austrina Mack.
Carex austroafricana (Kük.) Raymond
Carex austroalpina Bech.
Carex austroamericana G.A.Wheeler
Carex austrocaroliniana L.H.Bailey
Carex austrokoreensis Ohwi
Carex austromexicana Reznicek
Carex austro-occidentalis F.T.Wang & Tang ex Y.C.Tang
Carex austrosinensis Tang & F.T.Wang ex S.Y.Liang
Carex austrozhejiangensis C.Z.Zheng & X.F.Jin
Carex autumnalis Ohwi – Autumnal sand sedge
Carex aztecica Mack.
Carex azuayae Steyerm.

B

Carex baccans Nees
Carex backii Boott
Carex baileyi Britton
Carex baimaensis S.W.Su
Carex baiposhanensis P.C.Li
Carex × bakkeriana D.T.E.Ploeg & Rudolphy
Carex balansae Franch.
Carex baldensis L.
Carex balfourii Kük.
Carex ballsii Nelmes
Carex baltzellii Chapm.
Carex bambusetorum Merr.
Carex banksii Boott
Carex baohuashanica Tang & F.T.Wang ex L.K.Dai
Carex barbarae Dewey
Carex barbata Boott
Carex baronii Baker
Carex barrattii Torr. ex Schwein.
Carex basiantha Steud.
Carex bathiei H.Lév.
Carex bavicola Raymond
Carex bebbii Olney ex Britton
Carex beckii G.A.Wheeler
Carex × beckmanniana Figert
Carex × beckmannii Keck
Carex bella L.H.Bailey
Carex × bengyana H.Lév. & L.C.Lamb.
Carex benkei Tak.Shimizu
Carex bequaertii De Wild.
Carex berggrenii Petrie
Carex bermudiana Hemsl.
Carex berteroana Steud.
Carex berteroniana Steud.
Carex bichenoviana Boott
Carex bicknellii Britton & A.Br.
Carex bicolor Bellardi ex All.
Carex biegensis Cherm.
Carex bigelowii Torr. ex Schwein. – Gwanmo sedge
Carex × biharica Simonk.
Carex bijiangensis S.Yun Liang & S.R.Zhang
Carex bilateralis Hayata
Carex biltmoreana Mack.
Carex × binderi Podp.
Carex binervis Sm.
Carex bitchuensis T.Hoshino & H.Ikeda
Carex blakei Nelmes
Carex blanda Dewey
Carex blepharicarpa Franch. – ciliated-fruit sedge
Carex blinii H.Lév. & Vaniot
Carex bodinieri Franch.
Carex boecheriana Á.Löve, D.Löve & Raymond
Carex boelckeiana Barros
Carex × boenninghausiana Weihe
Carex × bogstadensis Kük.
Carex bohemica Schreb.
Carex bolanderi Olney
Carex × bolina Láng
Carex boliviensis Van Heurck & Müll.Arg.
Carex bonanzensis Britton – yukon sedge
Carex bonariensis Desf. ex Poir.
Carex bonplandii Kunth
Carex boottiana Hook. & Arn. – coastal rock sedge
Carex borbonica Lam.
Carex borealihinganica Y.L.Chang & Y.L.Yang
Carex borii Nelmes
Carex boryana Schkuhr
Carex bostrychostigma Maxim. – curled-stigma sedge
Carex brachyanthera Ohwi
Carex brachycalama Griseb.
Carex brachystachys Schrank
Carex bracteosa Kunze
Carex bradei Gross
Carex brainerdii Mack.
Carex brasiliensis A.St.-Hil.
Carex brassii Nelmes
Carex breviaristata K.T.Fu
Carex brevicollis DC.
Carex breviculmis R.Br. – mountain nerved-fruit sedge
 Carex breviculmis var. fibrillosa (Franch. & Sav.) Matsum. & Hayata – fibrillose short-stem sedge
Carex brevicuspis C.B.Clarke
Carex brevior (Dewey) Mack. ex Lunell
Carex breviscapa C.B.Clarke
Carex breweri Boott
Carex brizoides L.
Carex bromoides Willd.
Carex brongniartii Kunth
Carex brownii Tuck. – Brown's sedge
 Carex brownii subsp. transversa (Boott) J.Kern – transverse Brown's sedge
Carex brunnea Thunb.
Carex brunnescens (Pers.) Poir.
Carex brunnipes Reznicek
Carex brysonii Naczi
Carex buchananii Berggr.
Carex bucharica Kük.
Carex buekii Wimm.
Carex bulbostylis Mack.
Carex bullata Willd.
Carex burchelliana Boeckeler
Carex burttii Noltie
Carex bushii Mack.
Carex buxbaumii Wahlenb. – marsh sedge

C

Carex caduca Boott
Carex caeligena Reznicek
Carex × caesariensis Mack.
Carex caespititia Nees
Carex calcicola Tang & F.T.Wang
Carex calcifugens Naczi
Carex calcis K.A.Ford
Carex californica L.H.Bailey
Carex callista Nelmes
Carex callitrichos V.I.Krecz.
 Carex callitrichos var. nana (H.Lév. & Vaniot) S.Yun Liang, L.K.Dai & Y.C.Tang – low sedge
Carex cambodiensis Nelmes
Carex camposii Boiss. & Reut.
Carex campylorhina V.I.Krecz.
Carex canaliculata P.C.Li
Carex canariensis Kük.
Carex × candriana Kneuck.
Carex canescens L. – silvery sedge
Carex canina Dunn
Carex capillacea Boott – tiny sedge
 Carex capillacea var. sachalinensis (F.Schmidt) Ohwi – Sakhalin tiny sedge
Carex capillaris L. – hair-like sedge
Carex capilliculmis S.R.Zhang
Carex capilliformis Franch.
Carex capitata Sol.
Carex capitellata Boiss. & Balansa
Carex capricornis Meinsh. ex Maxim. – capricornis sedge – short-hair spring sedge
Carex cardiolepis Nees
Carex careyana Torr. ex Dewey
Carex × cariei Aubin
Carex caroliniana Schwein.
Carex carsei Petrie
Carex caryophyllea Latourr.
 Carex caryophyllea var. microtricha (Franch.) Kük.
Carex castanea Wahlenb.
Carex castanostachya K.Schum. ex Kük.
Carex catamarcensis C.B.Clarke ex Kük.
Carex cataphyllodes Nelmes
Carex cataractae R.Br.
Carex catharinensis Boeck.
Carex caudata (Kük.) Pereda & Laínz
Carex caudispicata F.T.Wang & Tang ex P.C.Li
Carex cavaleriensis H.Lév. & Vaniot
Carex caxinensis F.J.Herm.
Carex × cayouettei A.Bergeron
Carex celebica Kük.
Carex × cenantha A.E.Kozhevn.
Carex cephaloidea (Dewey) Dewey ex Boott
Carex cephalophora Muhl. ex Willd.
Carex cephalotes F.Muell.
Carex cercidascus C.B.Clarke
Carex cespitosa L. – turfy sedge
Carex × cetica Rech.
Carex ceylanica Boeckeler
Carex chaffanjonii E.G.Camus
Carex chalciolepis Holm
Carex changmuensis Tang & F.T.Wang ex Y.C.Yang
Carex chaofangii C.Z.Zheng & X.F.Jin
Carex chapmanii Steud.
Carex chathamica Petrie
Carex cheniana Tang & F.T.Wang ex S.Y.Liang
Carex cherokeensis Schwein.
Carex chiapensis F.J.Herm.
Carex chichijimensis Katsuy.
Carex chihuahuensis Mack.
Carex chikungana L.H.Bailey
Carex chillanensis Phil.
Carex chinensis Retz.
Carex chinoi Ohwi ex T.Koyama
Carex chiovendae Pamp.
Carex chiwuana F.T.Wang & Tang ex P.C.Li
Carex chlorantha R.Br.
Carex chlorocephalula F.T.Wang & Tang ex P.C.Li
Carex chloroleuca Meinsh.
Carex chlorosaccus C.B.Clarke
Carex chorda H.Lév. & Vaniot
Carex chordorrhiza L.f. – creeping sedge
Carex chosenica Ohwi – Korean sedge
Carex chrysolepis Franch. & Sav.
Carex chuiana F.T.Wang & Tang ex P.C.Li
Carex chuii Nelmes
Carex chungii Z.P.Wang
Carex cilicica Boiss.
Carex cinerascens Kük. – ashgrey sedge
Carex circinnata C.A.Mey.
Carex cirrhosa Berggr.
Carex cirrhulosa Nees
Carex × clausa Holmb.
Carex clavata Thunb.
Carex clivorum Ohwi
Carex cochinchinensis Raymond
Carex cochranei Reznicek
Carex cockayneana Kük.
Carex cognata Kunth
Carex colchica J.Gay
Carex colensoi Boott
Carex collifera Ohwi
Carex collimitanea V.I.Krecz.
Carex collinsii Nutt.
Carex collumanthus (Steyerm.) L.E.Mora
Carex comans Berggr.
Carex commixta Steud.
Carex communis L.H.Bailey
Carex comosa Boott
Carex complanata Torr. & Hook.
Carex composita Boott
Carex concinna R.Br.
Carex concinnoides Mack.
Carex condensata Nees
Carex conferta Hochst. ex A.Rich.
Carex confertospicata Boeckeler
Carex congdonii L.H.Bailey
Carex congestiflora Reznicek & S.González
Carex conica Boott – miniature sedge
Carex conjuncta Boott
Carex × connectens Holmb.
Carex conoidea Willd.
Carex conoides Kük.
Carex conspecta Mack.
Carex conspissata V.I.Krecz.
Carex constanceana Stacey
Carex continua C.B.Clarke
Carex contracta F.Muell.
Carex cordillerana Saarela & B.A.Ford
Carex cordouei H.Lév.
Carex coriacea Hamlin
Carex coriogyne Nelmes
Carex corrugata Fernald
Carex × corstorphinei Druce
Carex cortesii Liebm.
Carex × costei Rouy
Carex coulteri Boott ex Hemsl.
Carex coxiana Petrie
Carex cranaocarpa Nelmes
Carex crassibasis H.Lév. & Vaniot
Carex crassiflora Kük.
Carex crawei Dewey ex Torr.
Carex crawfordii Fernald
Carex crebra V.I.Krecz.
Carex crebriflora Wiegand
Carex cremnicola K.A.Ford
Carex × crepinii Torges
Carex cretica Gradst. & J.Kern
Carex crinita Lam.
Carex × crinitoides Lepage
Carex cristatella Britton & A.Br.
Carex cruciata Wahlenb.
Carex cruenta Nees
Carex crus-corvi Shuttlew. ex Kunze
Carex × cryptochlaena Holm
Carex cryptolepis Mack.
Carex cryptostachys Brongn.
Carex × csomadensis Simonk.
Carex cubensis Kük.
Carex cuchumatanensis Standl. & Steyerm.
Carex culmenicola Steyerm.
Carex cumberlandensis Naczi, Kral & Bryson
Carex cumulata (L.H.Bailey) Mack.
Carex cuprina (Sándor ex Heuff.) Nendtv. ex A.Kern.
Carex curaica Kunth
Carex curatorum Stacey
Carex curvicollis Franch. & Sav.
Carex curviculmis Reznicek
Carex curvula All.
Carex cusickii Mack.
Carex cuspidosa Dunn
Carex cylindrostachys Franch.
Carex cyprica A.M.Molina, Acedo & Llamas
Carex cyrtosaccus C.B.Clarke

D

Carex dabieensis S.W.Su
Carex dahurica Kük.
Carex dailingensis Y.L.Chou
Carex daisenensis Nakai
Carex dallii Kirk
Carex daltonii Boott
Carex damiaoshanensis X.F.Jin & C.Z.Zheng
Carex × danielis H.Lév.
Carex darwinii Boott
Carex dasycarpa Muhl.
Carex davalliana Sm.
Carex davidii Franch.
Carex david-smithii Reznicek
Carex davisii Schwein. & Torr.
Carex davyi Mack.
Carex dayuongensis Z.P.Wang
Carex × deamii F.J.Herm.
Carex debeauxii H.Lév. & Vaniot
Carex debilis Michx.
Carex decaulescens V.I.Krecz.
Carex decidua Boott
Carex deciduisquama F.T.Wang & Tang ex P.C.Li
Carex declinata Boott
Carex × decolorans Wimm.
Carex decomposita Muhl.
Carex decora Boott
Carex decurtata Cheeseman
Carex deflexa Hornem.
Carex × deinbolliana J.Gay
Carex delavayi Franch.
Carex delicata C.B.Clarke
Carex densa (L.H.Bailey) L.H.Bailey
Carex densicaespitosa L.K.Dai
Carex densifimbriata Tang & F.T.Wang
Carex densinervosa Chiov.
Carex densipilosa C.Z.Zheng & X.F.Jin
Carex depauperata Curtis ex Stokes
Carex depressa Link
Carex deqinensis L.K.Dai
Carex derelicta Å tepánková
Carex × descendens Kük.
Carex × deserta Merino
Carex desponsa Boott
Carex devia Cheeseman
Carex deweyana Schwein.
Carex dianae Steud.
Carex diandra Schrank
Carex diastena V.I.Krecz.
Carex dichroa Freyn
Carex dickinsii Franch. & Sav. – Dickins' sedge
Carex dielsiana Kük.
Carex digitalis Willd.
Carex digitata L.
Carex diluta M.Bieb.
Carex diminuta Boeckeler
Carex dimorpholepis Steud. – dimorphous-spike sedge
Carex dioica L.
Carex diplodon Nelmes
Carex dipsacea Berggr.
Carex dispalata Boott – curved-utricle sedge
Carex disperma Dewey – two-seed sedge
Carex dissita Sol. ex Boott
Carex dissitiflora Franch.
Carex dissitispicula Ohwi
Carex distachya Desf.
Carex distans L.
Carex distentiformis F.J.Herm.
Carex disticha Huds.
Carex distracta C.B.Clarke
Carex divisa Huds.
Carex divulsa Stokes
Carex doenitzii Boeckeler
Carex doisutepensis T.Koyama
Carex dolichogyne T.Koyama
Carex dolichostachya Hayata
Carex dolomitica Heenan & de Lange
Carex doniana Spreng. – Don's sedge
Carex donnell-smithii L.H.Bailey
Carex douglasii Boott
Carex drepanorhyncha Franch.
Carex druceana Hamlin
Carex drymophila Turcz. – forest-live sedge
Carex × ducellieri Beauverd
Carex × duereriana Kük.
Carex × dufftii Hausskn.
Carex × dumanii Lepage
Carex dunniana H.Lév.
Carex durangensis Reznicek & S.González
Carex durieui Steud. ex Kunze
Carex duriuscula C.A.Mey. – needle-leaf sedge
 Carex duriuscula subsp. rigescens (Franch.) S.Yun Liang & Y.C.Tang – rigescent sedge
Carex dusenii Kük. ex Dusén
Carex duvaliana Franch. & Sav.

E

Carex earistata F.T.Wang & Y.L.Chang ex S.Yun Liang
Carex ebenea Rydb.
Carex eburnea Boott
Carex echinata Murray – star sedge
Carex echinochloe Kunze
Carex echinochloiformis Y.L.Chang ex Y.C.Yang
Carex echinodes (Fernald) P.Rothr., Reznicek & Hipp
Carex echinus Ohwi
Carex ecklonii Nees
Carex ecostata C.B.Clarke
Carex ecuadorica Kük.
Carex edgariae Hamlin
Carex edwardsiana E.L.Bridges & Orzell
Carex egena H.Lév. & Vaniot
Carex egglestonii Mack.
Carex egorovae A.M.Molina, Acedo & Llamas
Carex ekmanii Kük.
Carex × elanescens Cif. & Giacom.
Carex elata All.
Carex elatior Boeckeler
Carex eleusinoides Turcz. ex Kunth – goosegrass sedge
Carex elingamita Hamlin
Carex × elisabethae J.Andrés & al.
Carex elliottii Schwein. & Torr.
Carex elongata L.
Carex eluta Nelmes
Carex elynoides Holm
Carex × elytroides Fr.
Carex emirnensis Baker
Carex × emmae L.Gross
Carex emoryi Dewey
Carex endlichii Kük.
Carex enervis C.A.Mey.
Carex engelmannii L.H.Bailey
Carex enneastachya C.B.Clarke
Carex enokii A.M.Molina, Acedo & Llamas
Carex ensifolia Turcz. ex Besser
Carex enysii Petrie
Carex erawinensis Korotky
Carex erebus K.A.Ford
Carex ereica Tang & F.T.Wang ex L.K.Dai
Carex eremitica Paine
Carex eremopyroides V.I.Krecz.
Carex eremostachya S.T.Blake
Carex ericetorum Pollich
Carex eriocarpa Hausskn. & Kük.
Carex erythrobasis H.Lév. & Vaniot – red-based leaf sedge
Carex erythrorrhiza Boeckeler
Carex esquiroliana H.Lév.
Carex esquirolii H.Lév. & Vaniot
Carex euprepes Nelmes
Carex euryphylla Cherm.
Carex evadens S.González & Reznicek
Carex × evoluta Hartm.
Carex excelsa Poepp. ex Kunth
Carex exilis Dewey
Carex × exsalina Lepage
Carex exsiccata L.H.Bailey
Carex extensa Gooden.

F

Carex faberiana Loes.
Carex fascicularis Boott
Carex fastigiata Franch.
Carex × favratii Christ
Carex feanii F.Br.
Carex fecunda Steud.
Carex feddeana H.Pfeiff.
Carex fedia Nees
Carex × felixii L.C.Lamb.
Carex fenghuangshanica F.T.Wang & Tang ex P.C.Li
Carex × ferdinandi-sauteri Asch. & Graebn.
Carex fernandezensis Mack. ex G.A.Wheeler
Carex ferruginea Scop.
Carex festivelloides Reznicek
Carex festucacea Schkuhr ex Willd.
Carex feta L.H.Bailey
Carex × figertii Asch. & Graebn.
Carex filamentosa Petrie
Carex filicina Nees
Carex filifolia Nutt.
Carex filiformis L.
Carex filipedunculata S.W.Su
Carex filipes Franch. & Sav. – fishing-rod-like sedge – papillose sedge
 Carex filipes var. oligostachys Kük.
Carex × filkukae Podp.
Carex fimbriata Schkuhr
Carex finitima Boott
Carex firma Host
Carex firmicaulis Kalela
Carex × firmior (Norman) Holmb.
Carex fischeri K.Schum.
Carex fissa Mack.
Carex fissuricola Mack.
Carex flabellata H.Lév. & Vaniot – flabellate sedge
Carex flacca Schreb.
Carex flaccosperma Dewey
Carex flagellifera Colenso
Carex flava L.
Carex × flavicans (F.Nyl.) F.Nyl.
Carex flaviformis Nelmes
Carex flavocuspis Franch. & Sav.
Carex flexirostris Reznicek
Carex flexuosa Muhl. ex Willd.
Carex floridana Schwein.
Carex fluviatilis Boott
Carex foenea Willd.
Carex foetida All.
Carex fokienensis Dunn
Carex foliosissima F.Schmidt
Carex folliculata L.
Carex foraminata C.B.Clarke
Carex foraminatiformis Y.C.Tang & S.Yun Liang
Carex forficula Franch. & Sav. – scissors-like sedge
Carex formosa Dewey
Carex forrestii Kük.
Carex forsteri Wahlenb.
Carex fossa G.A.Wheeler
Carex fracta Mack.
Carex fragilis Boott
Carex × fragosoana Pau
Carex frankii Kunth
Carex fretalis Hamlin
Carex × fridtzii Holmb.
Carex × friesii Blytt
Carex frigida All.
Carex fritschii Waisb.
Carex fructus Reznicek
Carex fucata Boott ex C.B.Clarke
Carex fuliginosa Schkuhr – short-leaf sedge
Carex fulta Franch.
Carex × fulva Gooden.
Carex fulvorubescens Hayata
Carex funhuangshanica F.T.Wang & Tang ex P.C.Li
Carex funingensis Tang & F.T.Wang ex S.Y.Liang
Carex furcata Boott ex C.B. Clarke
Carex furva Webb
Carex fusanensis Ohwi – black-tiny sedge
Carex fuscolutea Boeckeler
Carex fuscula d'Urv.
Carex fusiformis Nees
Carex × fussii Simonk.

G

Carex gandakiensis Katsuy.
Carex gaoligongshanensis P.C. Li
Carex garberi Fernald
Carex gaudichaudiana Kunth
Carex × gaudiniana Guthnick
Carex gayana Desv.
Carex gemella Hochst. ex Steud.
Carex geminata Schkuhr
Carex genkaiensis Ohwi – Mokpo sedge
Carex gentilis Franch.
Carex geophila Mack.
Carex × gerhardtii Figert
Carex geyeri Boott
Carex gholsonii Naczi & Cochrane
Carex gibba Wahlenb. – gibbous sedge
Carex gibbsiae Rendle
Carex gibertii G.A.Wheeler
Carex gifuensis Franch.
Carex gigantea Rudge
Carex × ginsiensis Waisb.
Carex giraldiana Kük.
Carex giraudiasii H.Lév.
Carex glabrescens (Kük.) Ohwi – glabrate sedge, hairy forest-live sedge
Carex glacialis Mack.
Carex glareosa Schkuhr ex Wahlenb.
Carex glaucescens Elliott
Carex glauciformis Meinsh. – pseudo-glaucous sedge
Carex glaucodea Tuck. ex Olney
Carex globistylosa P.C.Li
Carex globosa Boott
Carex globularis L. – globular-spike sedge
Carex globulosa Phulphong & D.A.Simpson
Carex glomerabilis V.I.Krecz.
Carex glossostigma Hand.-Mazz.
Carex gmelinii Hook. & Arn. – Gmelin's sedge
Carex godfreyi Naczi
Carex goligongshanensis P.C.Li
Carex gonggaensis P.C.Li
Carex gongshanensis Tang & F.T.Wang ex Y.C.Yang
Carex gonochorica Cherm.
Carex goodenoughii Gay
Carex gotoi Ohwi – two-toothed-beak sedge
Carex goyenii Petrie
Carex gracilenta Boott ex Boeckeler
Carex gracilescens Steud.
Carex graciliflora Dunn
Carex gracilior Mack.
Carex gracilispica Hayata
Carex gracillima Schwein.
Carex graeffeana Boeckeler
Carex grallatoria Maxim.
Carex graminiculmis T.Koyama
Carex graminifolia Cherm.
Carex grandiligulata Kük.
Carex granifera Dunn
Carex × grantii A.Benn.
Carex granularis Muhl. ex Willd.
Carex gravida L.H.Bailey
Carex grayi J.Carey
Carex griersonii Noltie
Carex grioletii Roem. ex Schkuhr
Carex grisea Wahlenb.
Carex × grossii Fiek
Carex guatemalensis F.J.Herm.
Carex guffroyi H.Lév. & Perrier
Carex gunniana Boott
Carex gynaecandra H.Pfeiff.
Carex gynandra Schwein.
Carex gynocrates Wormsk.
Carex gynodynama Olney

H

Carex hachijoensis Akiyama
Carex × haematolepis Drejer
Carex haematorrhyncha Ohwi & T.Koyama
Carex haematosaccus C.B.Clarke
Carex haematostoma Nees
Carex × hageri E.Baumann
Carex hakkodensis Franch.
Carex hakonemontana Katsuy.
Carex hakonensis Franch. & Sav. – small-needle sedge
Carex halleriana Asso
Carex halliana L.H.Bailey
Carex hallii Olney
Carex hanamninhensis K.K.Nguyen
Carex hancockiana Maxim. – Hancock's sedge
Carex hanensis Dunn
Carex hangtongensis H.Lév. & Vaniot
Carex hangzhouensis C.Z.Zheng, X.F.Jin & B.Y.Ding
Carex × hanseniana Junge
Carex harfordii Mack.
Carex harlandii Boott
Carex harrysmithii Kük.
Carex × hartii Dewey
Carex hartmanii Cajander
Carex hashimotoi Ohwi
Carex hassei L.H.Bailey
Carex hassiana Loes.
Carex hastata Kük.
Carex hatuyenensis K.K.Nguyen
Carex haydeniana Olney
Carex haydenii Dewey
Carex hebecarpa C.A.Mey.
Carex hebes Nelmes
Carex hebetata Boott
Carex hectori Petrie
Carex heleonastes Ehrh. ex L.f.
Carex helferi Boeckeler
Carex helingeeriensis L.Q. Zhao & J. Yang
Carex helleri Mack.
Carex helodes Link
Carex × helvola Blytt
Carex hemineuros T.Koyama
Carex hendersonii L.H.Bailey
Carex hermannii Cochrane
Carex herteri G.A.Wheeler
Carex heshuonensis S.Yun Liang
Carex heterodoxa Cherm.
Carex heterolepis Bunge – different-scale sedge
Carex heteroneura S.Watson
Carex × heterophyta Holmb.
Carex heterostachya Bunge – different-spike sedge
Carex heudesii H.Lév. & Vaniot
Carex hexinensis S.Yun Liang & Y.Z.Huang
Carex hezhouensis H.Wang & S.N.Wang
Carex × hibernica A.Benn.
Carex hieronymi Boeckeler
Carex hilairei Boott
Carex hilaireioides C.B.Clarke ex Kük.
Carex hildebrandtiana Boeckeler
Carex himalaica T.Koyama
Carex hinnulea C.B.Clarke
Carex hirsutella Mack.
Carex hirta L.
Carex hirtelloides (Kük.) F.T.Wang & Tang ex P.C.Li
Carex hirticaulis P.C.Li
Carex hirtifolia Mack.
Carex hirtigluma C.B.Clarke
Carex hirtissima W.Boott
Carex hirtiutriculata L.K.Dai
Carex hispida Willd. ex Schkuhr
Carex hitchcockiana Dewey
Carex hoatiensis H.Lév.
Carex hochstetteriana J.Gay ex Seub.
Carex holostoma Drejer
Carex holotricha Ohwi – woolly-scale sedge
Carex hondoensis Ohwi – Hondo sedge
Carex hongnoensis H.Lév.
Carex hongyuanensis Y.C.Tang & S.Yun Liang
Carex hoodii Boott
Carex hookeri Kunth
Carex hookeriana Dewey
Carex hoozanensis Hayata
Carex hopeiensis F.T.Wang & Tang
Carex hordeistichos Vill.
Carex hormathodes Fernald
Carex horsfieldii Boott
Carex hostiana DC.
Carex hotaizanensis Akiyama
Carex houghtoniana Torr. ex Dewey
Carex hovarum Cherm.
Carex huashanica Tang & F.T.Wang ex L.K.Dai
Carex hubbardii Nelmes
Carex huehueteca Standl. & Steyerm.
Carex hultenii Aspl.
Carex humahuacaensis G.A.Wheeler
Carex humbertiana Ohwi – Humbert's sedge
Carex humbertii Cherm.
Carex humboldtiana Steud.
Carex humida Y.L.Chang & Y.L.Yang
Carex humilis Leyss.
Carex humpatensis H.E.Hess
Carex huolushanensis P.C.Li
Carex husnotiana H.Lév.
Carex hwangii Matsuda
Carex hyalina Boott
Carex hyalinolepis Steud.
Carex hymenodon Ohwi
Carex hymenolepis Nees
Carex hypandra F.Muell.
Carex hypaneura V.I.Krecz.
Carex hypoblephara Ohwi & Ryu
Carex hypoleucos E. Desv.
Carex hypolytroides Ridl.
Carex hypsipedos C.B.Clarke
Carex hypsobates Nelmes
Carex hystericina Muhl. ex Willd.

I

Carex ichangensis C.B.Clarke
Carex idahoa L.H.Bailey
Carex idzuroei Franch. & Sav. – small Dickins' sedge
Carex iljinii V.I.Krecz.
Carex illegitima Ces.
Carex illota L.H.Bailey
Carex × ilseana Ruhmer
Carex imandrensis Kihlm. ex Hjelt
Carex impexa K.A.Ford
Carex impressinervia Bryson, Kral & Manhart
Carex impura Ohwi
Carex inamii Ohwi
Carex inanis Kunth
Carex incisa Boott – digitaria-like sedge
Carex inclinis Boott ex C.B.Clarke
Carex incomitata K.R.Thiele
Carex incurviformis Mack.
Carex indica L.
Carex indiciformis F.T.Wang & Tang ex P.C.Li
Carex indistincta H.Lév. & Vaniot
Carex indosinica Raymond
Carex infirminervia Naczi
Carex infossa Z.P.Wang
Carex infuscata Nees
Carex inopinata V.J.Cook
Carex inops L.H.Bailey
Carex insaniae Koidz.
Carex insignis Boott
Carex insularis Carmich.
Carex integra Mack.
Carex interior L.H.Bailey
Carex × interjecta Waisb.
Carex interrupta Boeckeler
Carex intumescens Rudge
Carex inversa R.Br.
Carex inversonervosa Nelmes
Carex × involuta (Bab.) Syme
Carex iraqensis S.S.Hooper & Kukkonen
Carex ischnogyne Gilli
Carex ischnostachya Steud. – thin-spiculate sedge
Carex ivanoviae T.V.Egorova
Carex ixtapalucensis Reznicek
Carex iynx Nelmes

J

Carex jacens C.B.Clarke
Carex jackiana Boott
 Carex jackiana var. macroglossa (Franch. &
Sav.) Kük. – big-tongue jack sedge
Carex jacutica V.I.Krecz.
Carex × jaegeri F.W.Schultz
Carex jaluensis Kom. – Amrokgang sedge
Carex jamesii Schwein.
Carex jamesonii Boott
Carex jankowskii Gorodkov
Carex japonica Thunb. – East Asian sedge
Carex jeanpertii E.G.Camus
Carex jiaodongensis Y.M.Zhang & X.D.Chen
Carex jinfoshanensis Tang & F.T.Wang ex S.Y.Liang
Carex jisaburo-ohwiana T.Koyama
Carex jizhuangensis S.Yun Liang
Carex johnstonii Boeckeler
Carex jonesii L.H.Bailey
Carex joorii L.H.Bailey
Carex × josephi-schmittii Raymond
Carex jubozanensis J.Oda & A.Tanaka
Carex juncella Th. Fries
Carex juniperorum Catling, Reznicek & Crins
Carex × justi-schmidtii Junge
Carex juvenilis C.B.Clarke ex E.G.Camus

K

Carex kabanovii V.I.Krecz.
Carex kagoshimensis Tak.Shimizu
Carex kaloides Petrie
Carex kansuensis Nelmes
Carex kaoi Tang & F.T.Wang ex S.Y.Liang
Carex karisimbiensis Cherm.
Carex karlongensis Kük.
Carex karoi (Freyn) Freyn
Carex kashmirensis C.B.Clarke
Carex × kattaeana Kük.
Carex kauaiensis R.W.Krauss
Carex kelloggii W.Boott
Carex × kenaica Lepage
Carex kermadecensis Petrie
Carex × ketonensis Akiyama
Carex khoii T.V.Egorova & Aver.
Carex kiangsuensis Kük.
Carex killickii Nelmes
Carex kimurae Ohwi & T.Koyama
Carex kingii (R.Br. ex Boott) Reznicek
Carex kiotensis Franch. & Sav.
Carex kirganica Kom. – seosura sedge, slender-culm thick-nerve sedge
Carex kirinensis W.Wang & Y.L.Chang
Carex kirkii Petrie
Carex kitaibeliana Degen ex Bech.
Carex klamathensis B.L.Wilson & Janeway
Carex klaphakei K.L.Wilson
Carex × knieskernii Dewey
Carex knorringiae Kük. ex Krecz.
Carex kobomugi Ohwi – Asian sand sedge
Carex × kohtsii K.Richt.
Carex korkischkoae A.E.Kozhevn.
Carex korshinskyi Kom. – Korshinsky's sedge
Carex koshewnikowii Litv.
Carex koyaensis J.Oda & Nagam.
Carex × krajinae Domin
Carex kraliana Naczi & Bryson
Carex krascheninnikovii Kom. ex V.I.Krecz.
Carex krascheninnikowii Kom. ex V. Krecz.
Carex krausei Boeckeler
Carex kreczetoviczii T.V.Egorova
Carex kuchunensis Tang & F.T.Wang ex S.Y.Liang
Carex kucyniakii Raymond
Carex × kuekenthaliana Appel & A.Brückn.
Carex × kuekenthalii Dörfl. ex Zahn
Carex kujuzana Ohwi – Jangseong sedge
Carex kulingana L.H.Bailey
Carex kumaonensis Kük.
Carex kurdica Kük. ex Hand.-Mazz.
Carex × kurilensis Ohwi
Carex kurtziana Kük.
Carex kwangsiensis F.T.Wang & Tang ex P.C.Li
Carex kwangtoushanica K.T.Fu
Carex × kyyhkynenii Hiitonen

L

Carex lachenalii Schkuhr – two-tip sedge
Carex lacistoma R.Br.
Carex × lackowitziana Aug.R.Paul
Carex lacustris Willd.
Carex laeta Boott
Carex laeviconica Dewey
Carex laeviculmis Meinsh.
Carex laevigata Sm.
Carex laevissima Nakai – small nerved-fruit sedge
Carex laevivaginata (Kük.) Mack.
Carex lageniformis Nelmes
Carex × laggeri Wimm.
Carex lagunensis M.E.Jones
Carex lainzii Luceño, E.Rico & T.Romero
Carex lambertiana Boott
Carex lamprocarpa Phil.
Carex lamprochlamys S.T.Blake
Carex lancangensis S.Yun Liang
Carex lanceolata Boott – lanceolate sedge
Carex lancifolia C.B.Clarke
Carex lancisquamata L.K.Dai
Carex × langeana Fernald
Carex × langii Steud.
Carex lankana T.Koyama
Carex laosensis Nelmes
Carex lapazensis C.B.Clarke
Carex lapponica O.Lang
Carex larensis Steyerm.
Carex laricetorum Y.L.Chou
Carex lasiocarpa Ehrh. – woolly-fruit sedge
Carex lasiolepis Franch.
Carex latebracteata Waterf.
Carex lateralis Kük.
Carex lateriflora Phil.
Carex laticeps C.B.Clarke ex Franch. – bent-beak sedge
Carex latisquamea Kom. – woolly-leaf sedge
Carex lativena S.D.Jones & G.D.Jones
Carex × lausii Podp.
Carex laxa Wahlenb. – loosely-spike sedge
Carex laxiculmis Schwein.
Carex laxiflora Lam.
Carex leavenworthii Dewey
Carex lebrunii H.Lév.
Carex ledebouriana C.A.Mey. ex Trevir.
Carex leersii F.W.Schultz
Carex lehmannii Drejer – Lehman's sedge
Carex leiorhyncha C.A.Mey. – mountain cat-tail sedge
Carex lemanniana Boott
Carex lemmonii W.Boott
Carex lenta D.Don – sluggish sedge
Carex lenticularis Michx.
Carex lepida Boott
Carex leporina L.
Carex leporinella Mack.
Carex leptalea Wahlenb.
Carex × leptoblasta Holmb.
Carex leptocladus C.B.Clarke
Carex leptonervia (Fernald) Fernald
Carex leptopoda Mack.
Carex leribensis Nelmes
Carex lessoniana Steud.
Carex leucantha Arn. ex Boott
Carex lianchengensis S.Yun Liang & Y.Z.Huang
Carex libera (Kük.) Hamlin
Carex × lidii Hadac
Carex ligata Boott
Carex × ligniciensis Figert
Carex ligulata Nees – ligulate sedge
Carex × limicola H.Gross
Carex × limnogena Appel
Carex limosa L. – mud sedge
Carex × limosoides J.Cay.
Carex limprichtiana Kük.
Carex × limula Fr.
Carex lindleyana Nees
Carex lingii F.T.Wang & Tang
Carex liouana F.T.Wang & Tang
Carex liparocarpos Gaudin
Carex liqingii Tang & F.T.Wang ex S.Y.Liang
Carex lithophila Turcz. – rock-loving sedge
Carex litorhyncha Franch.
Carex litorosa L.H.Bailey
Carex litvinovii Kük.
Carex liuii T.Koyama & T.I.Chuang
Carex livida (Wahlenb.) Willd. – livid sedge
Carex lobolepis F.Muell.
Carex lobulirostris Drejer
Carex loheri C.B.Clarke
Carex loliacea L. – ryegrass sedge
Carex lonchocarpa Willd. ex Spreng.
Carex longhiensis Franch.
Carex longibrachiata Boeckeler
Carex longicaulis Boeckeler
Carex longicruris Nees
Carex longiculmis Petrie
Carex longicuspis Boeckeler
Carex longii Mack.
Carex longiligula Reznicek & S.González
Carex longipes D.Don ex Tilloch & Taylor
Carex longirostrata C.A.Mey. – long-rostrate sedge
 Carex longirostrata var. pallida (Kitag.) Ohwi – pallid long-rostrate sedge
Carex longispiculata Y.C.Yang
Carex longissima M.E.Jones
Carex longpanlaensis S.Yun Liang
Carex longshengensis Y.C.Tang & S.Yun Liang
Carex longxishanensis S.Yun Liang
Carex lophocarpa C.B.Clarke
Carex × loretii Rouy
Carex louisianica L.H.Bailey
Carex lowei Bech.
Carex lucorum Willd.
Carex luctuosa Franch.
Carex × ludibunda J.Gay
Carex lupuliformis Sartwell ex Dewey
Carex lupulina Muhl. ex Willd.
Carex lurida Wahlenb.
Carex luridiformis Mack. ex Reznicek & S.González
Carex lushanensis Kük.
Carex lutea Leblond
Carex × luteola (Rchb.) Sendtn.
Carex luzulifolia W.Boott
Carex luzulina Olney
Carex lyi H.Lév. & Vaniot
Carex lyngbyei Hornem. – Lyngbye's sedge

M

Carex maackii Maxim. – Maack's sedge
Carex × macilenta F.Nyl.
Carex mackenziana Weath.
Carex mackenziei V.I.Krecz. – Mackenzie's sedge
Carex macloviana d'Urv.
Carex × macounii Dewey
Carex macrandrolepis H.Lév. & Vaniot – big male-scale sedge
Carex macrocephala Willd. ex Spreng.
Carex macrochaeta C.A.Mey.
Carex macrogyna Turcz. ex Steudel
Carex macrolepis DC.
Carex macrophyllidion Nelmes
Carex macrorrhiza Boeckeler
Carex macrosandra (Franch.) V.I.Krecz.
Carex macrosolen Steud.
Carex macrostigmatica Kük.
Carex macrostyla Lapeyr.
Carex macroura Meinsh.
Carex maculata Boott – maculate sedge
Carex madagascariensis Boeckeler
Carex madrensis L.H.Bailey
Carex magacis A.M.Molina, Acedo & Llamas
Carex magellanica Lam.
Carex magnoutriculata Tang & F.T.Wang ex L.K.Dai
Carex mairei Coss. & Germ.
Carex makinoensis Franch. – tufted rock-living sedge
Carex makuensis P.C.Li
Carex malaccensis C.B.Clarke
Carex malmei Kalela
Carex malyschevii T.V.Egorova
Carex manca Boott
Carex manciformis C.B.Clarke ex Franch.
Carex mandoniana Boeckeler
Carex mandshurica Meinsh. – Manchurian sedge
Carex manginii E.G.Camus
Carex manhartii Bryson
Carex mannii E.A.Bruce
Carex manongarivensis Cherm.
Carex maorica Hamlin
Carex maorshanica Y.L.Chou
Carex maquensis Y.C.Yang
Carex marahuacana Reznicek
Carex marianensis Stacey
Carex marina Dewey
Carex mariposana L.H.Bailey ex Mack.
Carex maritima Gunnerus
Carex markgrafii Kük.
Carex martinii H.Lév. & Vaniot
Carex martynenkoi Zolot.
Carex × massonii Cay. & Lepage
Carex matsumurae Franch. – big-wheat sedge
Carex maximowiczii Miq. – Maximowicz's sedge 
Carex mayebarana Ohwi
Carex mckittrickensis P.W.Ball
Carex mcvaughii Reznicek
Carex meadii Dewey
Carex media R.Br.
Carex mediterranea C.B.Clarke ex Post
Carex medwedewii Leskov
Carex meeboldiana Kük.
Carex meihsienica K.T.Fu
Carex meiocarpa H.Lév. & Vaniot
Carex melanantha C.A.Mey.
Carex melananthiformis Litv.
Carex melanocarpa Cham. ex Trautv.
Carex melanocephala Turcz. ex Kunth
Carex melanorrhyncha Nelmes
Carex melanostachya M.Bieb. ex Willd.
Carex melinacra Franch.
Carex membranacea Hook.
Carex × mendica Lepage
Carex mendocinensis Olney ex Boott
Carex merritt-fernaldii Mack.
Carex mertensii Prescott ex Bong.
Carex merxmuelleri Podlech
Carex mesochorea Mack.
Carex metallica H.Lév. – white-spike sedge
Carex meyenii Nees
Carex meyeriana Kunth – Meyer's sedge
Carex michauxiana Boeckeler
Carex michelii Host
Carex michoacana Reznicek, Hipp & S.González
Carex micrantha Kük. – small-flower sedge
Carex microcarpa Bertol. ex Moris
Carex microchaeta Holm
Carex microdonta Torr.
Carex microglochin Wahlenb.
Carex micropoda C.A.Mey.
Carex microptera Mack.
Carex microrhyncha Mack.
Carex × microstachya Ehrh.
Carex × microstyla J.Gay ex Gaudin
Carex middendorffii F.Schmidt
Carex mildbraediana Kük.
Carex millsii Dunn
Carex mingrelica Kük.
Carex minuticulmis S.W.Su & S.M.Xu
Carex minutiscabra Kük. ex Krecz.
Carex minutissima Barros
Carex minxianensis S.Yun Liang
Carex minxianica Y.C.Yang
Carex mira Kük. – remarkable sedge
Carex × mirata Dewey
Carex misera Buckley
Carex missouriensis P.Rothr. & Reznicek
Carex mitchelliana M.A.Curtis
Carex × mithala Callier
Carex mitrata Franch. – mitra sedge
 Carex mitrata var. aristata Ohwi – aristate mitra sedge
Carex miyabei Franch.
Carex mochomuensis Katsuy.
Carex modesti M.Escudero, Martín-Bravo & Jim.Mejías
Carex mokkwaensis Akiyama
Carex molesta Mack.
Carex molestiformis Reznicek & Rothrock
Carex molinae Phil.
Carex mollicula Boott – small mucronate sedge
Carex mollissima Christ ex Scheutz – softest sedge
Carex monodynama (Griseb.) G.A.Wheeler
Carex monostachya A.Rich.
Carex monotropa Nelmes
Carex montana L.
Carex montanoaltaica Zolot.
Carex montis-eeka Hillebr.
Carex montis-everesti Kük.
Carex montis-wutaii T.Koyama
Carex moorei G.A.Wheeler
Carex morii Hayata
Carex × moriyoshiensis Fujiw. & Y.Matsuda
Carex morrowii Boott
Carex mossii Nelmes
Carex motuoensis Y.C.Yang
Carex moupinensis Franch.
Carex mucronata All.
Carex mucronatiformis Tang & F.T.Wang ex S.Yun Liang
Carex × mucronulata Holmb.
Carex muehlenbergii Willd.
Carex muelleri Petrie
Carex × muelleriana F.W.Schultz
Carex muliensis Hand.-Mazz.
Carex multicaulis L.H.Bailey
Carex multicostata Mack.
Carex munda Boott
Carex munipoorensis C.B.Clarke
Carex munroi Boott ex C.B.Clarke
Carex muricata L.
Carex muriculata F.J.Herm.
Carex × musashiensis Ohwi
Carex musei Steud.
Carex muskingumensis Schwein.
Carex myosuroides Vill.
Carex myosurus Nees

N

Carex nachiana Ohwi
Carex nairii Ghildyal & U.C.Bhattach.
Carex nakasimae Ohwi
Carex nanchuanensis K.L.Chu ex S.Y.Liang
Carex nandadeviensis Ghildyal, U.C.Bhattach. & Hajra
Carex nangtciangensis Pamp.
Carex nardina (Hornem.) Fr.
Carex neblinensis Reznicek
Carex nebrascensis Dewey
Carex nebularum Phil.
Carex neesiana Endl.
Carex negrii Chiov.
Carex nelmesiana Barros
Carex nelmesii H.E.Hess
Carex nelsonii Mack.
Carex nemostachys Steud.
Carex nemurensis Franch.
Carex × neobigelowii Lepage
Carex neochevalieri Kük. ex A.Chev.
Carex neodigyna P.C.Li
Carex × neofilipendula Lepage
Carex neofilipes Nakai
Carex neoguinensis C.B.Clarke
Carex neohebridensis Guillaumin & Kük.
Carex neokukenthaliana H.Lév. & Vaniot
Carex × neomiliaris Lepage
Carex neopetelotii Raymond
Carex neopolycephala Tang & F.T.Wang ex L.K.Dai
Carex × neorigida Lepage
Carex nervata Franch. & Sav. – nerved-mitra sedge
Carex nervina L.H.Bailey
Carex neurocarpa Maxim. – nerved-fruit sedge
Carex neurophora Mack.
Carex nevadensis Boiss. & Reut.
Carex × nicoloffii Pamp.
Carex niederleiniana Boeckeler
Carex nigerrima Nelmes
Carex nigra (L.) Reichard
Carex nigricans C.A.Mey.
Carex nigromarginata Schwein.
Carex nikolskensis Kom.
Carex nitidiutriculata L.K.Dai
Carex nivalis Boott
Carex nodaeana A.I.Baranov & Skvortsov
Carex nodiflora Boeckeler
Carex nordica A.M.Molina, Acedo & Llamas
Carex normalis Mack.
Carex norvegica Retz. – Norway sedge
Carex notha Kunth
Carex nova L.H.Bailey
Carex novae-angliae Schwein.
Carex novogaliciana Reznicek
Carex × nubens Lepage
Carex nubigena D.Don ex Tilloch & Taylor
Carex nudata W.Boott
Carex nugata Ohwi

O

Carex × oberrodensis B.Walln.
Carex obispoensis Stacey
Carex oblanceolata T.Koyama
Carex obliquicarpa X.F.Jin, C.Z.Zheng & B.Y.Ding
Carex obliquitruncata Y.C.Tang & S.Yun Liang
Carex obnupta L.H.Bailey
Carex obovatosquamata F.T.Wang & Y.L.Chang ex P.C.Li
Carex obscura Nees
Carex obscuriceps Kük.
Carex obtusata Lilj.
Carex occidentalis L.H.Bailey
Carex ochrochlamys Ohwi – yellow-mantle sedge
Carex ochrosaccus (C.B.Clarke) Hamlin
Carex oedipostyla Duval-Jouve
Carex oedorrhampha Nelmes
Carex × oenensis A.Neumann ex B.Walln.
Carex × ohmuelleriana O.Lang
Carex okamotoi Ohwi – creeping narrow-leaf sedge
Carex oklahomensis Mack.
Carex olbiensis Jord.
Carex oligantha Steud.
Carex oligocarpa Willd.
Carex oligocarya C.B.Clarke
Carex oligosperma Michx.
Carex oligostachya Nees
Carex olivacea Boott
Carex olivieri H.Lév.
Carex × olneyi Boott
Carex omeiensis Tang
Carex omeyica Molina Gonz., Acedo & Llamas
Carex omiana Franch. & Sav. – Suwon sedge
Carex omurae T.Koyama
Carex × oneillii Lepage
Carex onoei Franch. & Sav. – needle sedge
Carex opaca (F.J.Herm.) P.Rothr. & Reznicek
Carex ophiolithica Heenan & de Lange
Carex ophiopogon H.Lév.
Carex orbicularinucis L.K.Dai
Carex orbicularis Boott
Carex oreocharis Holm
Carex oreophila C.A.Mey.
Carex orizabae Liebm.
Carex ormostachya Wiegand
Carex ornithopoda Willd.
Carex oronensis Fernald
Carex orthostemon Hayata
Carex oshimensis Nakai
Carex otaruensis Franch.
Carex × otayai Ohwi
Carex otomana A.M.Molina, Acedo & Llamas
Carex ouachitana Kral, Manhart & Bryson
Carex ovatispiculata F.T.Wang & Y.L.Chang ex S.Yun Liang
Carex ovoidoconica Ohwi
Carex ownbeyi G.A.Wheeler
Carex oxyandra (Franch. & Sav.) Kudô – hill sedge
Carex oxylepis Torr. & Hook.
Carex ozarkana P.Rothr. & Reznicek

P

Carex pachygyna Franch. & Sav.
Carex pachyneura Kitag.
Carex pachystylis J.Gay
Carex × paczoskii Zapal.
Carex paeninsulae Naczi, E.L.Bridges & Orzell
Carex pairae F.W.Schultz
Carex paishanensis Nakai
Carex palawanensis Kük.
Carex paleacea Schreb. ex Wahlenb.
Carex pallescens L.
Carex pallidula Harmaja
Carex × paludivagans W.H.Drury
Carex pamirica (O.Fedtsch.) O.Fedtsch. & B.Fedtsch.
Carex pandanophylla C.B.Clarke
Carex panicea L.
Carex paniculata L.
Carex panormitana Guss.
Carex pansa L.H.Bailey
Carex papillosissima Nelmes
Carex × paponii Muret ex T.Durand & Pittier
Carex papulosa Boott
Carex paracuraica F.T.Wang & Y.L.Chang ex S.Yun Liang
Carex parallela (Laest.) Sommerf.
Carex parryana Dewey
Carex parva Nees
Carex parviflora Host
Carex parvigluma C.B.Clarke
Carex patagonica Speg.
Carex × patuensis Lepage
Carex pauciflora Lightf. – few-flower sedge
Carex paucimascula H.Lév. & Vaniot
Carex paui Sennen
Carex × paulii Asch. & Graebn.
Carex paulo-vargasii Luceño & Marín
Carex paupera Nelmes
Carex paxii Kük. – Pax's sedge
Carex paysonis Clokey
Carex peckii Howe
Carex pediformis C.A.Mey. – wide-leaf low sedge
Carex pedunculata Muhl. ex Willd.
Carex peiktusanii Kom. – Baekdu sedge
Carex peliosanthifolia F.T.Wang & Tang ex P.C.Li
Carex pellita Muhl. ex Willd.
Carex pelocarpa F.J.Herm.
Carex pendula Huds.
Carex penduliformis Cherm.
Carex pensylvanica Lam.
Carex perakensis C.B.Clarke
Carex percostata F.J.Herm.
Carex perdentata S.D.Jones
Carex peregrina Link
Carex perglobosa Mack.
Carex pergracilis Nelmes
Carex perlonga Fernald
Carex perprava C.B.Clarke
Carex perraudieriana (Kük. ex Bornm.) Gay ex Kük.
Carex × persalina Lepage
Carex pertenuis L.H.Bailey
Carex peruviana J.Presl & C.Presl
Carex peruvida G.A.Wheeler
Carex petasata Dewey
Carex petelotii Gross
Carex petitiana A.Rich.
Carex petricosa Dewey
Carex petriei Cheeseman
Carex peucophila Holm
Carex phacota Spreng. – lentoid sedge
Carex phaeocephala Piper
Carex phaeodon T.Koyama
Carex phaeothrix Ohwi – brown-spike sedge
Carex phalaroides Kunth
Carex phankei K.K.Nguyen
Carex phoenicis Dunn
Carex phragmitoides Kük.
Carex phyllocaula Nelmes
Carex phyllocephala T.Koyama
Carex phyllostachys C.A.Mey.
Carex × physocarpoides Lepage
Carex physodes M.Bieb.
Carex pichinchensis Kunth
Carex picta Steud.
Carex pigra Naczi
Carex pilosa Scop. – pilose-leaf sedge
Carex × pilosiuscula Gobi
Carex pilulifera L.
Carex pinophila Reznicek & S.González
Carex pisanensis T.Koyama
Carex pisanoi G.A.Wheeler
Carex pisiformis Boott – thread sedge, Sakhalin mitra sedge, alternate-flower thread sedge
 Carex pisiformis var. sikokiana (Franch. & Sav.) T.Koyama – green thread sedge
Carex pityophila Mack.
Carex planata Franch. & Sav.
Carex planiculmis Kom. – shady mucronate sedge
Carex planiscapa Chun & F.C.How
Carex planispicata Naczi
Carex planostachys Kunze
Carex plantaginea Lam.
Carex platyphylla J.Carey
Carex platysperma Y.L.Chang & Y.L.Yang
Carex plectobasis V.I.Krecz.
Carex pleiandra Ohwi
Carex pleioneura G.A.Wheeler
Carex pleiostachys C.B.Clarke
Carex pleurocaula Nelmes
Carex × ploettneriana Beyer
Carex pluriflora Hultén
Carex poculisquama Kük. – bowl-shape-scale sedge
Carex podocarpa R.Br.
Carex podogyna Franch. & Sav.
Carex poeppigii C.B.Clarke ex G.A.Wheeler
Carex poilanei Raymond
Carex polyantha F.Muell.
Carex polycephala Boott
Carex polymascula P.C.Li
Carex polymorpha Muhl.
Carex polyschoenoides K.T.Fu
Carex polystachya Sw. ex Wahlenb.
Carex polysticha Boeckeler
Carex pomiensis Y.C.Yang
Carex pontica Albov
Carex popovii V.I.Krecz.
Carex porrecta Reznicek & Camelb.
Carex potosina Hemsl.
Carex praeceptorium Mack.
Carex praeclara Nelmes
Carex praecox Schreb.
Carex praegracilis W.Boott
Carex × prahliana Junge
Carex prairea Dewey ex Alph.Wood
Carex prasina Wahlenb.
Carex praticola Rydb.
Carex preissii Nees
Carex prescottiana Boott
Carex preslii Steud.
Carex pringlei L.H.Bailey
Carex projecta Mack.
Carex × prolixa Fr.
Carex prolongata Kük.
Carex proposita Mack.
Carex provotii Franch.
Carex proxima Cherm.
Carex pruinosa Boott
Carex przewalskii T.V.Egorova
Carex pseudoaperta Boeckeler ex Kük.
Carex × pseudoaxillaris K.Richt.
Carex pseudobicolor Boeckeler
Carex pseudobrizoides Clavaud
Carex pseudochinensis H.Lév. & Vaniot –  false Chinese sedge
Carex pseudocuraica F.Schmidt – creeper-like sedge
Carex pseudocyperus L.
Carex pseudodahurica A.P.Khokhr.
Carex pseudodispalata K.T.Fu
Carex pseudofoetida Kük. ex Ostenf.
Carex × pseudohelvola Kihlm.
Carex pseudohumilis F.T.Wang & Y.L.Chang ex P.C.Li
Carex pseudohypochlora Y.L.Chang & Y.L.Yang
Carex pseudolaticeps Tang & F.T.Wang ex S.Y.Liang
Carex pseudoligulata L.K.Dai
Carex pseudololiacea F.Schmidt
Carex pseudomacloviana G.A.Wheeler
Carex × pseudomairei E.G.Camus
Carex pseudophyllocephala L.K.Dai
Carex pseudosadoensis Akiyama
Carex pseudospachiana H.Lév. & Vaniot
Carex pseudosphaerogyna Nelmes
Carex pseudosupina Y.C.Tang ex L.K.Dai
Carex pseudotristachya X.F.Jin & C.Z.Zheng
Carex × pseudovulpina K.Richt.
Carex psilocarpa Steud.
Carex psychrophila Nees
Carex pterocarpa Petrie
Carex pterocaulos Nelmes
Carex pubigluma Reznicek
Carex pudica Honda
Carex pulchra Boott
Carex pulchrifolia A.E.Kozhevn.
Carex pulicaris L.
Carex pumila Thunb. – dwarf sand sedge
Carex punctata Gaudin
Carex purdiei Boott
Carex purplevaginalis Q.S.Wang
Carex purpureosquamata L.K.Dai
Carex purpureotincta Ohwi
Carex purpureovagina F.T.Wang & Y.L.Chang ex S.Yun Liang
Carex purpureovaginata Boeckeler
Carex purpurifera Mack.
Carex × putjatini Kom.
Carex putuoensis S.Yun Liang
Carex pycnostachys Kar. & Kir.
Carex pygmaea Boeckeler
Carex pyramidalis Kük.
Carex pyrenaica Wahlenb.

Q

Carex qingdaoensis F.Z.Li & S.J.Fan
Carex qinghaiensis Y.C.Yang
Carex qingliangensis D.M.Weng, H.W.Zhang & S.F.Xu
Carex qingyangensis S.W.Su & S.M.Xu
Carex qiyunensis S.W.Su & S.M.Xu
Carex quadriflora (Kük.) Ohwi – four-flower sedge
Carex × quebecensis Lepage
Carex queretarensis Reznicek & S.González
Carex quichensis F.J.Herm.
Carex × quirponensis Fernald

R

Carex × raciborskii Zapal.
Carex raddei Kük. – Radde's sedge
Carex radfordii Gaddy
Carex radiata (Wahlenb.) Small
Carex radicalis Boott
Carex radiciflora Dunn
Carex radicina Z.P.Wang
Carex rainbowii Luceño, Jim.Mejías, M. Escudero & Martín-Bravo
Carex raleighii Nelmes
Carex ramenskii Kom.
Carex ramentaceofructus K.T.Fu
Carex ramosa Willd.
Carex ramosii Kük.
Carex randalpina B.Walln.
Carex raoulii Boott
Carex raphidocarpa Nees
Carex rara Boott – pine-leaf sedge
Carex rariflora (Wahlenb.) Sm.
Carex ratongensis (C.B.Clarke) C.B.Clarke
Carex raynoldsii Dewey
Carex recta Boott
Carex × reducta Drejer
Carex regeliana (Kük.) Litv.
Carex reichei Kük.
Carex reinii Franch. & Sav.
Carex relaxa V.I.Krecz.
Carex remota L.
Carex remotiuscula Wahlenb. – minute-gibbous sedge
Carex renauldii H.Lév.
Carex reniformis (L.H.Bailey) Small
Carex renschiana Boeckeler
Carex repanda C.B.Clarke
Carex repens Bellardi
Carex reptabunda (Trautv.) V.I.Krecz.
Carex resectans Cheeseman
Carex retroflexa Muhl. ex Willd.
Carex retrofracta Kük.
Carex retrorsa Schwein.
Carex reznicekii Werier
Carex rhizina Blytt ex Lindblom
Carex rhodesiaca Nelmes
Carex rhombifructus Ohwi
Carex rhynchoperigynium S.D.Jones & Reznicek
Carex rhynchophysa Fisch., C.A.Mey. & Avé-Lall. – large-spike sedge
Carex rhynchophora Franch.
Carex richardsonii R.Br.
Carex ridongensis P.C.Li
Carex × rieseana Figert
Carex rigidioides (Gorodkov) V.I.Krecz.
Carex × rikuchiuensis Akiyama
Carex riloensis Stoeva & E.D.Popova
Carex riparia Curtis
Carex rivulorum Dunn
Carex roanensis F.J.Herm.
Carex robinsonii Podlech
Carex roraimensis Steyerm.
Carex rorulenta Porta
Carex rosea Willd.
Carex × rossiana Degen
Carex rossii Boott
Carex rostellifera Y.L.Chang & Y.L.Yang
Carex rostrata Stokes – beak sedge
Carex × rotae De Not.
Carex rotundata Wahlenb. – round sedge
Carex royleana Nees
Carex rubicunda Petrie
Carex rubrobrunnea C.B.Clarke
Carex rufina Drejer
Carex rufulistolon T.Koyama
Carex rugata Ohwi
Carex rugulosa Kük. – thick-nerve sedge
Carex runssoroensis K.Schum.
Carex rupestris All. – curly sedge
Carex rupicola (Pedersen) G.A.Wheeler
Carex ruralis J.Oda & Nagam.
Carex rutenbergiana Boeckeler
Carex ruthii Mack.
Carex ruthsatziae G.A.Wheeler
Carex rzedowskii Reznicek & S.González

S

Carex sabulosa Turcz. ex Kunth
Carex sacerdotis Nelmes
Carex sachalinensis F.Schmidt
Carex sacrosancta Honda
Carex sadoensis Franch.
Carex sagaensis Y.C.Yang
Carex sagei Phil.
Carex sahnii Ghildyal & U.C.Bhattach.
Carex sajanensis V.I.Krecz.
Carex × sakaguchii Ohwi
Carex sakonis T.Koyama
Carex salina Wahlenb.
Carex × salisiana Brügger
Carex saltaensis Gross
Carex sambiranensis (H.Lév.) Cherm.
Carex sampsonii Hance
Carex sanctae-marthae L.E.Mora & J.O.Rangel
Carex × sanionis K.Richt.
Carex sarawaketensis Kük.
Carex × sardloqensis E.Dahl
Carex sartwelliana Olney
Carex sartwellii Dewey
Carex satsumensis Franch. & Sav.
Carex savaiiensis Kük.
Carex saxatilis L.
Carex × saxenii Raymond
Carex saxicola Tang & F.T.Wang
Carex saximontana Mack.
Carex scabrata Schwein.
Carex scabrella Wahlenb.
Carex scabrifolia Steud. – scabrous-leaf sedge
Carex scabripes Cherm.
Carex scabrirostris Kük.
Carex scabrisacca Ohwi & Ryu
Carex scabriuscula Mack.
Carex scaposa C.B.Clarke
Carex schaffneri Boeckeler
Carex × schallertii Murr
Carex schiedeana Kunze
Carex schlechteri Nelmes
Carex schliebenii Podlech
Carex schmidtii Meinsh. – Schmidt's sedge
Carex schneideri Nelmes
Carex schottii Dewey
Carex × schuetzeana Figert
Carex schwackeana Boeckeler
Carex schweinitzii Dewey ex Schwein.
Carex scirpoidea Michx.
Carex scita Maxim.
Carex scitiformis Kük.
Carex scitula Boott
Carex sclerocarpa Franch.
Carex scolopendriformis F.T.Wang & Tang ex P.C.Li
Carex scoparia Willd.
Carex scopulorum Holm
Carex secalina Willd. ex Wahlenb.
Carex secta Boott
Carex sectoides (Kük.) Edgar
Carex sedakowii C.A.Mey. ex Meinsh. – Sedakov's sedge
Carex sellowiana Schltdl.
Carex semihyalofructa Tak.Shimizu
Carex sempervirens Vill.
Carex × senayana Soó
Carex × sendtneriana Brügger
Carex senta Boott
Carex seorsa Howe
Carex seposita C.B.Clarke
Carex serpenticola Zika
Carex serratodens S.Watson
Carex × serravalensis Beauverd
Carex serreana Hand.-Mazz.
Carex seticulmis Boeckeler
Carex setifolia Kunze
Carex setigera D.Don
Carex setigluma Reznicek & S.González
Carex setispica C.B.Clarke
Carex setosa Boott
Carex shaanxiensis F.T.Wang & Tang ex P.C.Li
Carex × shakushizawaensis Akiyama
Carex shandanica Y.C.Yang
Carex shanensis C.B.Clarke
Carex shangchengensis S.Yun Liang
Carex shanghaiensis S.X.Qian & Y.Q.Liu
Carex shanghangensis S.Yun Liang
Carex sheldonii Mack.
Carex shimidzensis Franch. – long-tail-spike sedge
Carex × shinanoana Nakai ex Aliyama
Carex shinnersii P.Rothr. & Reznicek
Carex shiriyajirensis Akiyama ex Tatew.
Carex shortiana Dewey & Torr.
Carex shuangbaiensis L.K.Dai
Carex shuchengensis S.W.Su & Q.Zhang
Carex siccata Dewey
Carex sichouensis P.C.Li
Carex siderosticta Hance – creeping broad-leaf sedge
 Carex siderosticta var. pilosa H.Lév. ex T.Koyama – hairy creeping broad-leaf sedge
Carex silicea Olney
Carex silvestrii Pamp.
Carex simensis Hochst. ex A.Rich.
Carex simulans C.B.Clarke
Carex simulata Mack.
Carex sinclairii Boott ex Cheeseman
Carex sinoaristata Tang & F.T.Wang ex L.K.Dai
Carex sinodissitiflora Tang & F.T.Wang ex L.K.Dai
Carex sinomairei H.Lév.
Carex siroumensis Koidz. – potae sedge
Carex skottsbergiana Kük.
Carex socialis Mohlenbr. & Schwegman
Carex sociata Boott
Carex socotrana Repka & P.Madera
Carex soczavaeana Gorodkov
Carex sodiroi Kük.
Carex × soerensenii Lepage
Carex sohachii Ohwi
Carex solandri Boott
Carex × sooi Jakucs
Carex sordida Van Heurck & Müll.Arg. – short forest-live sedge
Carex sorianoi Barros
Carex sororia Kunth
Carex sozusensis Ohwi
Carex spachiana Boott
Carex sparganioides Muhl. ex Willd.
Carex specifica L.H.Bailey
Carex speciosa Kunth
Carex spectabilis Dewey
Carex specuicola J.T.Howell
Carex sphaerogyna Baker
Carex spicata Huds.
Carex spicatopaniculata Boeckeler ex C.B.Clarke
Carex spicigera Nees
Carex × spiculosa Fr.
Carex spilocarpa Steud.
Carex spinirostris Colenso
Carex spissa L.H.Bailey ex Hemsl.
Carex spongiosa Ohwi
Carex sprengelii Dewey ex Spreng.
Carex × squamigera V.I.Krecz. & Luchnik
Carex squarrosa L.
Carex standleyana Steyerm.
Carex stenandra Kük.
Carex stenantha Franch. & Sav.
Carex stenocarpa Turcz. ex V.I.Krecz.
Carex × stenolepis Less.
Carex stenophylla Wahlenb.
Carex stenoptila F.J.Herm.
Carex stenostachys Franch. & Sav.
Carex sterilis Willd.
Carex steudneri Boeckeler
Carex stevenii (Holm) Kalela
Carex steyermarkii Standl.
Carex stipata Muhl. ex Willd. – awl-fruit sedge
Carex stiphrogyne Gilli
Carex stipitiutriculata P.C.Li
Carex stokesii F.Br.
Carex stracheyi Boott ex C.B.Clarke
Carex stramentitia Boott ex Boeckeler
Carex straminea Willd. ex Schkuhr
Carex straminiformis L.H.Bailey
Carex streptorrhampha Nelmes
Carex striata Michx.
Carex striatula Michx.
Carex stricta Lam.
Carex × stricticulmis Holmb.
Carex × strictiformis Almq.
Carex strigosa Huds.
Carex × strigosula Chatenier
Carex stuessyi G.A.Wheeler
Carex × stygia Fr.
Carex styloflexa Buckley
Carex stylosa C.A.Mey.
Carex subandrogyna G.A.Wheeler & Guagl.
Carex subantarctica Speg.
Carex subbracteata Mack.
Carex subcapitata X.F.Jin, C.Z.Zheng & B.Y.Ding
Carex subcernua Ohwi
Carex × subcostata Holmb.
Carex subdivulsa (Kük.) G.A.Wheeler
Carex subdola Boott
Carex subebracteata (Kük.) Ohwi – beaked-fruit narrow mitra sedge
Carex suberecta (Olney) Britton
Carex subfilicinoides Kük.
Carex subfuegiana G.A.Wheeler
Carex × subimpressa Clokey
Carex subinclinata T.Koyama
Carex subinflata Nelmes
Carex sublateralis T.Koyama
Carex submollicula Tang & F.T.Wang ex L.K.Dai
Carex subnigricans Stacey
Carex × subpaleacea J.Cay.
Carex × subpatula Holmb.
Carex subperakensis L.K.Ling & Y.Z.Huang
Carex subphysodes Popov ex V.I.Krecz.
Carex subpumila Tang & F.T.Wang ex L.K.Dai
Carex × subrecta J.Cay.
Carex × subsalina Lepage
Carex subscabrella Kük.
Carex subspathacea Wormsk. ex Hornem. – Hoppner's sedge
Carex subumbellata Meinsh. – subumbellate sedge
Carex suifunensis Kom. – narrow-scale sedge
Carex × sullivantii Boott
Carex × sumikawaensis Fujiw. & Y.Matsuda
Carex superata Naczi, Reznicek & B.A.Ford
Carex supina Willd. ex Wahlenb.
Carex sutchuensis Franch.
Carex × suziella Podp.
Carex swanii (Fernald) Mack.
Carex sychnocephala J.Carey
Carex sylvatica Huds.
Carex × sylvenii Holmb.

T

Carex tachirensis Steyerm.
Carex tahitensis F.Br.
Carex tahoensis Smiley
Carex taihokuensis Hayata
Carex taihuensis S.W.Su & S.M.Xu
Carex taipaishanica K.T.Fu
Carex × takoensis Y.Endo & Yashiro
Carex tamana Steyerm.
Carex tangiana Ohwi
Carex tangii Kük.
Carex tangulashanensis Y.C.Yang
Carex tapintzensis Franch.
Carex taprobanensis T.Koyama
Carex tarumensis Franch.
Carex tashiroana Ohwi
Carex tasmanica Kük.
Carex tatjanae Malyschev
Carex tatsiensis (Franch.) Kük.
Carex tavoyensis Nelmes
Carex tegulata H.Lév. & Vaniot – orbicular sedge
Carex teinogyna Boott – slender-pedicel sedge
Carex tenax Chapm. ex Dewey
Carex × tenebricans Holmb.
Carex tenebrosa Boott
Carex tenejapensis Reznicek & S.González
Carex × tenelliformis Holmb.
Carex tenera Dewey
Carex tenuiculmis (Petrie) Heenan & de Lange
Carex tenuiflora Wahlenb. – sparse-flower sedge
Carex tenuiformis H.Lév. & Vaniot – shadow sedge
Carex tenuinervis Ohwi
Carex tenuior T.Koyama & T.I.Chuang
Carex tenuipaniculata P.C.Li
Carex tenuiseta Franch.
Carex tenuispicula Tang ex S.Y.Liang
Carex teres Boott
Carex tereticaulis F.Muell.
Carex ternaria G.Forst.
Carex tessellata Spruce ex C.B.Clarke
Carex testacea Sol. ex Boott
Carex tetanica Schkuhr
Carex tetrastachya Scheele
Carex texensis (Torr. ex L.H.Bailey) L.H.Bailey
Carex thailandica T.Koyama
Carex thanikaimoniana Govind.
Carex thecata Boott
Carex thibetica Franch.
Carex thompsonii Franch.
Carex thomsonii Boott
Carex thornei Naczi
Carex thouarsii Carmich.
Carex thunbergii Steud.
Carex thurberi Dewey ex Torr.
Carex tianmushanica C.Z.Zheng & X.F.Jin
Carex tianschanica T.V.Egorova
Carex timida Naczi & B.A.Ford
Carex × timmiana Junge
Carex tincta (Fernald) Fernald
Carex titovii V.I.Krecz.
Carex × toezensis Simonk.
Carex tojquianensis Standl. & Steyerm.
Carex tokarensis T.Koyama
Carex tolucensis (F.J.Herm.) Reznicek
Carex tompkinsii J.T.Howell
Carex tonsa (Fernald) E.P.Bicknell
Carex toreadora Steyerm.
Carex × torgesiana Kük.
Carex × tornabenei Chiov.
Carex toroensis G.A.Wheeler
Carex torreyi Tuck.
Carex torta Boott ex Tuck.
Carex tovarensis Reznicek & G.A.Wheeler
Carex townsendii Mack.
Carex toyoshimae Tuyama
Carex trachycarpa Cheeseman
Carex trachycystis Griseb.
Carex traiziscana F.Schmidt
Carex transandina G.A.Wheeler
Carex transcaucasica T.V.Egorova
Carex transversa Boott
Carex trautvetteriana Kom.
Carex traversii Kirk
Carex × treverica Hausskn.
Carex triangularis Boeckeler
Carex tribuloides Wahlenb.
Carex tricephala Boeckeler
Carex × trichina Fernald
Carex trichocarpa Muhl. ex Willd.
Carex trichodes Steud.
Carex tricholepis Nelmes
Carex trichophylla Nelmes
Carex tricolor Velen.
Carex trifida Cav.
Carex trigonosperma Ohwi
Carex trinervis Degl.
Carex triquetra Boott
Carex trisperma Dewey
Carex tristachya Thunb. – shiny-spike sedge
 Carex tristachya var. pocilliformis (Boott) Kük. – small shiny-spike sedge
Carex tristis M.Bieb.
Carex trongii K.K.Nguyen
Carex troodi Turrill
Carex truncatigluma C.B.Clarke
Carex tsaiana F.T.Wang & Tang ex P.C.Li
Carex tsaratananensis Cherm.
Carex tsiangii F.T.Wang & Tang
Carex tsoi Merr. & Chun
Carex tsushimensis (Ohwi) Ohwi
Carex tuberculata Liebm.
Carex tubulosa Pamp.
Carex tuckermanii Boott
Carex tucumanensis G.A.Wheeler
Carex tumidula Ohwi
Carex tuminensis Kom. – Dumangang sedge
Carex tumulicola Mack.
Carex tungfangensis L.K.Dai & S.M.Huang
Carex tunimanensis Standl. & Steyerm.
Carex turbinata Liebm.
Carex × turfosa Fr.
Carex turgescens Torr.
Carex turkestanica Regel
Carex turrita C.B.Clarke
Carex × turuli Simonk.
Carex turumiquirensis Steyerm.
Carex tweedieana Nees
Carex typhina Michx.

U

Carex uda Maxim. – Uda needle sedge
Carex × uechtritziana K.Richt.
Carex ulobasis V.I.Krecz. – montane sedge
Carex umbellata Willd.
Carex umbrosa Host
 Carex umbrosa subsp. sabynensis (Less. ex Kunth) Kük. – narrow mitra sedge
Carex umbrosiformis H.Lév.
Carex uncifolia Cheeseman
Carex × ungavensis Lepage
Carex ungurensis Litv.
Carex unilateralis Mack.
Carex unisexualis C.B.Clarke
Carex urelytra Ohwi
Carex ursina Dewey
Carex uruguensis Boeckeler
Carex ussuriensis Kom. – Ussuri sedge
Carex utriculata Boott
Carex × uzenensis Koidz.

V

Carex vacillans Drejer
Carex vaginata Tausch – sheathed sedge
Carex valbrayi H.Lév.
Carex vallicola Dewey
Carex vallis-pulchrae Phil.
Carex vallis-rosetto K.Schum.
Carex van-heurckii Müll.Arg. – northern meadow sedge
Carex ventosa C.B.Clarke
Carex venusta Dewey
Carex vernacula L.H.Bailey
Carex verrucosa Muhl.
Carex verticillata Zoll. & Moritzi
Carex vesca C.B.Clarke ex Kük.
Carex vesicaria L. – blister sedge
Carex vesiculosa Boott
Carex vestita Willd.
Carex vexans F.J.Herm.
Carex × viadrina Figert
Carex vicinalis Boott
Carex vietnamica Raymond
Carex × villacensis Kük.
Carex × vimariensis Hausskn. ex Berthold
Carex virescens Muhl. ex Willd.
Carex virgata
Carex viridimarginata Kük.
Carex viridistellata Derieg, Reznicek & Bruederle
Carex viridula Michx.
Carex vixdentata (Kük.) G.A.Wheeler
Carex × vratislaviensis Figert
Carex vulcani Hochst. ex Seub.
Carex vulpina L.
Carex vulpinaris Nees
Carex vulpinoidea Michx.

W

Carex wahlenbergiana Boott
Carex wahuensis C.A.Mey.
Carex wakatipu Petrie
Carex × walasii Ceyn.-Gield
Carex walkeri Arn. ex Boott
Carex wallichiana Spreng.
Carex wawuensis W.M.Chu ex S.Yun Liang
Carex wenshanensis L.K.Dai
Carex werdermannii L.Gross
Carex whitneyi Olney
Carex wiegandii Mack.
Carex wightiana Nees
Carex willdenowii  Schkuhr ex Willd.
Carex williamsii Britton
Carex × winkelmannii Asch. & Graebn.
Carex winterbottomii C.B.Clarke
Carex × wolteri Gross
Carex woodii Dewey
Carex wootonii Mack.
Carex wui W.M.Chu ex L.K.Dai
Carex wushanensis S.Yun Liang
Carex wutuensis K.T.Fu
Carex wuyishanensis S.Yun Liang

X

Carex × xanthocarpa Degl.
Carex xerantica L.H.Bailey
Carex xiangxiensis Z.P.Wang
Carex xiphium Kom. – sword-like sedge

Y

Carex yajiangensis Tang & F.T.Wang ex S.Yun Liang
Carex yamatsutana Ohwi
Carex yangshuoensis Tang & F.T.Wang ex S.Y.Liang
Carex yasuii Katsuy.
Carex yonganensis L.K.Dai & Y.Z.Huang
Carex ypsilandrifolia F.T.Wang & Tang
Carex yuexiensis S.W.Su & S.M.Xu
Carex yulungshanensis P.C.Li
Carex yunlingensis P.C.Li
Carex yunnanensis Franch.
Carex yunyiana X.F.Jin & C.Z.Zheng
Carex yushuensis Y.C.Yang

Z

Carex × zahnii Kneuck.
Carex zekogensis Y.C.Yang
Carex zhenkangensis Tang & F.T.Wang ex S.Yun Liang
Carex zhonghaiensis S.Yun Liang
Carex zizaniifolia Raymond
Carex zuluensis C.B.Clarke
Carex zunyiensis Tang & F.T.Wang

References

List
Carex
Carex